Paranoia is a 1953 short story collection by the Dutch writer Willem Frederik Hermans. The titular story was adapted into the 1967 film Paranoia, directed by Adriaan Ditvoorst, and into a play written and directed by Inge-Vera Lipsius, performed on location at The Merchant House, Amsterdam, in October 2022.

Contents
 Preambule
 Manuscript in een kliniek gevonden
 Paranoia
 Het behouden huis
 Glas
 Lotti Fuehrscheim

See also
 1953 in literature
 Dutch literature

References

1953 short story collections
Dutch short story collections
Literary works by Willem Frederik Hermans